The Bishopric of Lodève is a former Roman Catholic diocese in southern France. Its episcopal see was located in Lodève, in the modern department of Hérault. Its territory is now part of the archdiocese of Montpellier.

History
Since the 14th century local tradition has made St. Florus first bishop of Lodève, and relates that as a disciple of St. Peter, he afterwards evangelized Haute-Auvergne and died in the present village of Saint-Flour.

Bishops of Lodève have existed since 421; the first historically known bishop is Maternus, who was present at the Council of Agde in 506. Among the bishops of Lodève are:  (863–884), previously a Benedictine monk; St. Fulcran (949–1006), who in 975 dedicated the cathedral of St. Genès and founded the Abbey of St. Sauveur; the Dominican inquisitor Bernard Gui (1324–1331); Cardinal Guillaume d'Estouteville (1450–1453), who played an important part as papal legate, also in the rehabilitation of Joan of Arc; the brothers Guillaume Briçonnet (1489–1516) and Denis Briçonnet (1516–1520).

A Brief of 16 June 1877, authorized the bishops of Montpellier to call themselves bishops of Montpellier, Béziers, Agde, Lodève, and Saint-Pons (Saint-Pons-de-Thomières), in memory of the different former suffragan dioceses at that date united in the present metropolitan archbishopric of Montpellier.

Bishops of Lodève

To 1000

 Saint Florus ?
 Ranulphus ? 492
 Maternus 506
 Deutere 535
 Edibius ? 557
 Agrippin 589
 Leonce 610
 Anatole 633
 Firmin 652
 Ansemond 683
 Eugenius ? 694
 Bernechaire ? 711
 Michel ? 769
 Nebridius ?
 Sisemond 817
 Sylvain 824
 Radulphus 840
 Tatila 844
 St. George  863–884 (Benedictine monk, who is known to have contributed in 861 for the foundation of  l'abbaye de Vabres, by  Raymond I, comte de Toulouse et de Rouergue
 Macaire 884
 Antgiaire 906
 Rodulphus ?
 Thierry 911–949
 Saint Fulcran 949–1006

1000–1300

 Mainfroi 1006–1015
 Olombel 1015–1040
 Bernard I. 1042–1049
 Bernard II. 1050
 Rostaing 1054–ca. 1075
 Bernard III. de Prévenchères 1077–1099
 Dieudonné I. de Caylus 1100–1102
 Pierre I. de Raymond 1102–1154
 Pierre II. de Posquières 1155–1161
 Gaucelin de Raymond de Montpeyroux 1162–1182
 Raymond I. Guilhem Madières 1162–1201
 Pierre III. de Frottier 1200–1207
 Pierre IV. de Lodève 1208–1238
 Bertrand de Mornas 1237–1241
 Guillaume I. de Cazouls 1241–1259
 Raymond II. de Bellin 1259–1262
 Raymond III. d'Astolphe de Rocozels 1263–1280
 Bérenger I. de Boussages 1280–1284
 Bérenger II. de Guitard 1285–1290
 Bernard IV. Poitevin 1290–1292
 Gaucelin de la Garde 1292–1296
 Ithier of Bordeaux, O.Min. 1296–1302

1300–1500

 Dieudonné II. de Boussages 1302–1312
 Bernard V. de Guitard 1313–1313
 Guillaume II. du Puy 1314–1315
 Guillaume III. de Mandagot 1316–1317
 Gui de Perpignan 1317–1318
 Jacques I. de Cabrerets de Coucots 1318–1322
 Jean I. de Tixerandrerie 1322–1324
 Bernard VI. de la Guionie (i.e. Bernard Gui) 1324–1331
 Bernard VII. Dumas 1332–1348
 Robert de la Vie 1348–1356
 Gilbert de Montdragon 1357–1361
 Aymeric d'Hugues 1361–1370
 Gui de Malsec 1370–1371
 Jean II. Gastel 1371–1374
 Ferry Cassinel 1374–1382
 Pierre V. Girard 1382–1385
 Clément de Grammont 1385–1392
 Guillaume IV. de Grimoard 1392–1398
 Jean III. de la Vergne 1399–1413
 Micuel Le Boeuf 1413–1430
 Pierre VI. de la Treille 1430–1441
 Jacques de Gaujac 1441–1450
 Guillaume d'Estouteville 1450–1453
 Jean de Corguilleray 1462–1488
 Guillaume de Briçonnet 1489–1516

1500–suppression

 Denis Briçonnet 1516–1520
 René I. du Puy 1520–1524
 Jean Mattei Giberti 1526–1528
 Laurent Toscan 1528–1529
 Lélio des Ursins de Céri 1537–1546
 Gui Ascanio Sforza, Cardinal 1546–1547
 Dominique du Gabre 1547–1557
 Bernard VIII. del Bene 1558–1560
 Michel II. Briçonnet 1560–1561
 Claude Briçonnet 1561–1566
 Pierre VII. de Barrault 1566–1569
 Alphonse Vercelli 1570–1573
 René II. de Biragne 1573–1580
 Christophe de Lestang 1580–1602
 Gérard de Rolin 1607–1611
 François de Lévis Ventadour (Administrator ?)
 Charles de Lévis-Vantadour (Administrator ?)
 Anne de Lévis-Ventadour (Administrator ?)
 Jean VI. Plantavit de la Pause 1625–1651
 François de Bosquet 1648–1655
 Roger de Harlay de Cési 1657–1669
 Jean-Armand de Rotundis de Biscarras 1669–1671
 Jean-Antoine de La Garde de Chambonas 1671–1690
 Jacques-Antoine de Phelypeaux 1690–1732
 Jean-Georges de Souillac 1732–1750
 Jean-Félix-Henri de Fumel 1750–1790
 Jean-Georges Gabriel de Levezou 1790–

See also
 Catholic Church in France
 List of Catholic dioceses in France

References

Bibliography

Reference works
  (Use with caution; obsolete)
  (in Latin) 
 (in Latin)

Studies

Sources
 Gallia Christiana  ;
 Histoire de Lodève,  by Ernest Martin

 
Lodeve
Dioceses established in the 5th century
5th-century establishments in sub-Roman Gaul